The Friends of Australia Congressional Caucus is the bipartisan caucus within the U.S. Congress that seeks to "promote a deeper cultural understanding, enhance our mutual security, and strengthen our economic ties" between the United States and Australia. The caucus was founded by Jennifer Dunn and Cal Dooley.

This group corresponds to the U.S./Australia Parliamentary Friendship Group in the Parliament of Australia.

See also
 Australia–United States relations
 U.S./Australia Parliamentary Friendship Group

Caucuses of the United States Congress
Australia–United States relations
Australia friendship associations
United States friendship associations